Henning Jensen (10 April 1910 – 21 August 1992) was a Danish footballer. He played in three matches for the Denmark national football team from 1931 to 1932.

References

External links
 

1910 births
1992 deaths
Danish men's footballers
Denmark international footballers
Place of birth missing
Association footballers not categorized by position